The Baltimore county executive is the highest elected official representing the government of Baltimore County, Maryland, United States. The office was established with the implementation of the county charter for Baltimore County on November 6, 1956. The county executive is elected to post every four years, coinciding with the elections for the county council and governor of Maryland.

The current Baltimore county executive is Johnny A. Olzewski Jr. Two Baltimore county executives have later achieved prominence after leaving office: Spiro T. Agnew, who went on to become governor of Maryland and Vice President of the United States under Richard Nixon, resigned in 1973 due to scandal while serving in that office; and Dutch Ruppersberger, who currently represents Maryland's 2nd congressional district in the United States House of Representatives.

List of Baltimore county executives

Notes
 Acting county executive after the conviction and resignation of Anderson
 Acting county executive after the death of Kamenetz
 Appointed to fill remainder of Kamenetz's term

References